The Haast Schist, which contains both the Alpine and Otago Schist, is a metamorphic unit in the South Island of New Zealand. It extends from Central Otago, along the eastern side of the Alpine Fault to Cook Strait. There are also isolated outcrops of the Haast Schist within the central North Island. The schists were named after Haast Pass on the West Coast. The Haast Schist can be divided geographically from north to south into the Kaimanawa, Terawhiti, Marlborough, Alpine, Otago and Chatham schist.

Description 
The metamorphic grade progresses from greenschist, biotite, garnet and finally orthoclase. Myrmekitic textures occur within oligoclase within the garnet zone. The schist's protoliths were the greywacke and argillite of the Caples Terrane and Torlesse Composite Terrane. The schists were originally brought to the surface of the Earth's crust in the Cretaceous and again during the Kaikoura Orogeny along the Alpine Fault. Pounamu (Jade) is found as isolated pods in the higher metamorphic grades near the Alpine Fault.

See also 

 Geology of Canterbury, New Zealand
 Stratigraphy of New Zealand

References

Further reading 
 The Rise and Fall of the Southern Alps, G. Coates 2002

Geologic formations of New Zealand
Paleozoic Oceania
Permian Oceania
Triassic Oceania
Jurassic System of Oceania
Schist formations
Geography of Canterbury, New Zealand
Geography of the Marlborough Region
Geography of Otago
Geography of the Chatham Islands